AOE or AoE may refer to:

Arts and entertainment 
 Age of Empires, a series of real-time strategy video games, or the first game of the series
 Area of effect, a term used in gaming to describe area attacks
 Transformers: Age of Extinction, a 2014 film

Technology 
 ATA over Ethernet (AoE), lightweight storage area network protocol
 Audio over Ethernet, the concept of using an Ethernet-based network to transmit digital audio in audio engineering
 Alpha Omega Epsilon, a social and professional sorority for women in engineering and technical sciences

Transport 
 Airport of entry, an airport that provides customs and immigration services
 American Orient Express
 AOE, a United States Navy hull classification symbol for a fast combat support ship

Other
 Acute otitis externa, an infection of the external ear canal
 Alberta Order of Excellence, a high notary award given in Alberta, Canada
 Anywhere on Earth (AoE), a calendar designation for UTC−12:00
 Assembly of Experts, an Iranian governmental body
 Axis of evil, a term used by former U.S. President George W. Bush in his 2002 State of the Union address

See also
 AEO (disambiguation)